Kosalam (pronounced kōsalam) is a ragam in Carnatic music (musical scale of South Indian classical music). It is the 71st Melakarta rāgam in the 72 melakarta rāgam system of Carnatic music and is the prati madhyamam equivalent of Shoolini, which is the 35th melakarta. It is called Kusumākaram in Muthuswami Dikshitar school of Carnatic music.

Structure and Lakshana

Kosalam is the 5th rāgam in the 12th chakra Aditya. The mnemonic name is Aditya-Ma. The mnemonic phrase is sa ru gu mi pa dhi nu. Its  structure (ascending and descending scale) is as follows (see swaras in Carnatic music for details on below notation and terms):
: 
: 
(the scale's notes are shatsruthi rishabham, antara gandharam, prati madhyamam, chathusruthi dhaivatham, kakali nishadham)

Kosalam is a melakarta rāgam and hence, by definition, it is a sampoorna rāgam (it has all seven notes in ascending and descending scale).

Janya rāgams 
Kosalam has a janya rāgam (derived scale) associated with it. See List of janya rāgams for list of rāgams associated with Kosalam and other melakarta rāgams.

Compositions 
A few compositions set to Kosalam rāgam are:

Sri chakrapura vasini by Muthiah Bhagavatar
Idi neeku nyayama by Mysore Vasudevachar
Ubhaya kaveri by Veene Sheshanna
Ka Guha Shanmukha by Koteeswara Iyer
Ō ManasĀ muktiNi ganumu by Dr. M. Balamuralikrishna

Famous Movie song incorporating Kosalam is Sundari Kannal from Dalapathy movie in addition to Kalyani.

Related rāgams 
This section covers the theoretical and scientific aspect of Kosalam.

Kosalam's notes when shifted using Graha bhedam, yields 3 other melakarta rāgams, namely, Keeravani, Hemavati and Vakulabharanam. Graha bhedam is the step taken in keeping the relative note frequencies same, while shifting the shadjam to the next note in the rāgam. For further details and an illustration refer Graha bhedam on Keeravani.

Notes

References

Melakarta ragas